Sombai (from  – "some rice, please") is a liqueur manufacturer in Siem Reap founded in 2012. Its beverages have become a national drink of Cambodia and symbolic of Siem Reap. Sombai is one of the most popular brands in Cambodia.

Products

The Sombai liqueurs were created in 2012 initially from rice wine by the Mauritian Joëlle Jean-Louis and her husband Lionel Maitrepierre drawing inspiration from the Cambodian traditional infused rice wine sraa tram. The Sombai bottles are hand-painted. There are 8 different flavours which are always a combination of 2 fruits or spices.

It is usually consumed either neat or on the rocks. Sombai infused rice wines is also an ingredient in several Cambodian cocktails such as Asana Sling, Lemon Lemongrass Tini, Sombai Blue, Sombai Fizz, Siem Reap Monsoon, and Sombai Sour. Several leading establishments in Siem Reap sell Sombai rice wine and its cocktails and use it in their cooking, such as Chef Pola Siv at Mie Café and the Park Hyatt.

Production workshop 

In 2014 a Sombai workshop and tasting parlour was set up in the artist's Leang Seckon's house, and has become a tourist attraction in town. It also sells products from the sister brand Joe's Cuisine (speciality foods, like spices or alcoholic jams) and Joe's Kampot Pepper Liqueur.

In popular culture 
Sombai-based cocktails are sold in a trendy bar in Washington DC in Backup Man, a science fiction novel written by Paul Di Filippo taking place in the 2050s: Particulate-filtering airfish drifting gently through the biolit dimness; imene tuki and Karelian rune singing on the sound system; sombai cocktails at twenty NUbucks a pop.

References

External links

Official Sombai website

Liqueurs
 
Cambodian brands
Food and drink companies of Cambodia